Michael Borgqvist (born 17 December 1967 in Stockholm, Sweden) is a Swedish football manager and former football player. He is currently without a club after most recently leaving Hammarby IF in Superettan.

Borgqvist was a notable football player with over 100 games played in the Swedish highest league Allsvenskan. He has played for both AIK and Djurgårdens IF from Stockholm. He won the Swedish Allsvenskan with AIK 1992. He has also played for Assyriska FF and Enköpings SK, where he ended his playing career in 2003. Borgqvist played as a midfielder.

After ending his career in 2003, he started a managing career with taking over his most recent club Enköpings SK in 2005. After a few years in the club he quit in 2006. In 2008, he moved on to become the trainer of Assyriska FF in Superettan. He only stayed for a short time in the club. In December 2009, he was appointed as the new manager for newly relegated Hammarby IF in Superettan. Jesper Blomqvist was appointed as his assistant manager.

Honours

Club 

 Djurgårdens IF
 Division 1 Norra (1): 1998

References

External links
  (archive)

1967 births
Living people
Swedish footballers
Allsvenskan players
Spårvägens FF players
AIK Fotboll players
Djurgårdens IF Fotboll players
Assyriska FF players
Enköpings SK players
Swedish football managers
Hammarby Fotboll managers
Assyriska FF managers
Association football midfielders
Footballers from Stockholm